This is a list of films produced in the Colombian cinema, ordered by year and decade of release.

1910s

1920s

1930s

1940s

1950s

1960s

1970s

1980s

1990s

2000s

2010s

2020s

See also 

 List of Colombian documentary films
 List of films depicting Colombia
 World cinema

References

External links

 Proimágenes Colombia official website
 Fundación Patrimonio Filmico Colombiano app website

Colombia
Films